Tracy Boe is a North Dakota Democratic-NPL Party member of the North Dakota House of Representatives, representing the 9th district since 2003.

General references
Representative Tracy Boe in the North Dakota Legislative Assembly

External links
Project Vote Smart – Representative Tracy Boe (ND) profile

Living people
People from Rolette County, North Dakota
21st-century American politicians
Year of birth missing (living people)
Democratic Party members of the North Dakota House of Representatives